The Battle of Iwo Jima (19 February – 26 March 1945) was a major battle in which the United States Marine Corps (USMC) and United States Navy (USN) landed on and eventually captured the island of Iwo Jima from the Imperial Japanese Army (IJA) during World War II. The American invasion, designated Operation Detachment, had the purpose of capturing the island with its two airfields: South Field and Central Field.

The American ground forces were supported by extensive naval artillery and had complete air supremacy provided by U.S. Navy and Marine Corps aviators throughout the battle. The five-week battle saw some of the fiercest and bloodiest fighting of the Pacific War.

The Japanese combat deaths numbered three times the number of American deaths, but uniquely among Pacific War Marine battles, the American total casualties (dead and wounded) exceeded those of the Japanese. Of the 21,000 Japanese soldiers on Iwo Jima at the beginning of the battle, only 216 were taken prisoner, some of whom were captured only because they had been knocked unconscious or otherwise disabled. Most of the remainder were killed in action, but it has been estimated that as many as 3,000 continued to resist within the various cave systems for many days afterwards until they eventually succumbed to their injuries or surrendered weeks later. Despite the fighting and severe casualties on both sides, the American victory was assured from the start. Overwhelming American superiority in numbers and arms, air supremacy, the impossibility of Japanese retreat or reinforcement, and sparse food and supplies for the Japanese, permitted no plausible circumstance in which the Japanese could have won the battle.

The action was controversial, with retired Chief of Naval Operations William V. Pratt stating that the island was useless to the Army as a staging base, and useless to the Navy as a fleet base. The Japanese continued to have early-warning radar from Rota island, which was never invaded, and Iwo Jima's captured air field was barely used. Experiences with previous Pacific island battles suggested that the island would be well-defended and thus casualties would be significant. Joe Rosenthal's Associated Press photograph of the raising of the U.S. flag at the top of the  Mount Suribachi by five U.S. Marines and one Navy corpsman became a famous image of the battle and the American war effort in the Pacific.

Background

After the American capture of the Marshall Islands and the devastating air attacks against the Japanese fortress island of Truk Atoll in the Carolines in January 1944, the Japanese military leaders reevaluated their situation. All indications pointed to an American drive toward the Mariana Islands and the Carolines. To counter such an offensive, the IJA and the Imperial Japanese Navy (IJN) established an inner line of defenses extending generally northward from the Carolines to the Marianas and then to Japan via the Volcano Islands and westward from the Marianas via the Carolines and the Palau Islands to the Philippines.

In March 1944, the Japanese 31st Army, commanded by General Hideyoshi Obata, was activated to garrison this inner line. (Note that a Japanese army was about the size of an American, British Army, or Canadian Army corps. The Japanese Army had many armies, but the U.S. Army had only ten at its peak, with the 4th Army, the 6th Army, the 8th Army, and the 10th Army being in the Pacific Theater. Also, the 10th Army fought on Okinawa only in the spring of 1945.)

The commander of the Japanese garrison on Chichi Jima was placed nominally in command of Army and Navy units in the Volcano Islands. After the American conquest of the Marianas, daily bomber raids from the Marianas hit the mainland as part of Operation Scavenger. Iwo Jima served as an early warning station that radioed reports of incoming bombers back to mainland Japan. That allowed Japanese air defenses to prepare for the arrival of the American bombers.

After the U.S. seized bases in the Marshall Islands in the Battles of Kwajalein and Eniwetok in February 1944, Japanese Army and Navy reinforcements were sent to Iwo Jima: 500 men from the naval base at Yokosuka and 500 from Chichi Jima reached Iwo Jima during March and April 1944. At the same time, with reinforcements arriving from Chichi Jima and the home islands, the army garrison on Iwo Jima reached a strength of more than 5,000 men. The loss of the Marianas during the summer of 1944 greatly increased the importance of the Volcano Islands for the Japanese, who were afraid that the loss of those islands would facilitate American air raids against the Home Islands, disrupt war manufacturing, and severely damage civilian morale.

The final Japanese plans for the defense of the Volcano Islands were overshadowed by several factors:

 The navy had already lost almost all of its power, and it could not prevent American landings.
 Aircraft losses in 1944 had been so heavy that even if war production were not affected by American air attacks, the combined Japanese air strength was not expected to increase to 3,000 warplanes until March or April 1945.
 The available warplanes had to be hoarded to defend Taiwan and the Japanese Home Islands from any attack.
 There was a serious shortage of properly trained and experienced pilots and other aircrew to man the warplanes that Japan had because such large numbers of pilots and crewmen had perished fighting over the Solomon Islands and during the Battle of the Philippine Sea in mid-1944.

In a postwar study, Japanese staff officers described the strategy used in the defense of Iwo Jima in the following terms:

At the end of the Battle of Leyte in the Philippines, the Allies were left with a two-month lull in their offensive operations before the planned invasion of Okinawa. Iwo Jima was considered strategically important since it provided an air base for Japanese fighter planes to intercept long-range B-29 Superfortress bombers. In addition, it was used by the Japanese to stage nuisance air attacks on the Mariana Islands from November 1944 to January 1945. The capture of Iwo Jima would eliminate those problems. The base would be available for P-51 Mustang fighters to escort and protect the bombers.

American intelligence sources were confident that Iwo Jima would fall in one week. In light of the optimistic intelligence reports, the decision was made to invade Iwo Jima, and the operation was codenamed Operation Detachment. American forces failed to anticipate that the Japanese would prepare a complex and deep defense, much like on Peleliu in the fall of 1944. So successful was the Japanese preparation that it was discovered after the battle that the hundreds of tons of Allied bombs and thousands of rounds of heavy naval gunfire had left the Japanese defenders almost undamaged and ready to inflict losses on the U.S. Marines.

Planning and preparation

Japanese preparations

By June 1944, Lieutenant General Tadamichi Kuribayashi was assigned to command the defense of Iwo Jima. Kuribayashi knew that Japan could not win the battle, but he hoped to inflict massive casualties on the American forces so that the United States, and its Australian and British allies, would reconsider carrying out their invasion of the Japanese home islands.

While drawing inspiration from the defense in the Battle of Peleliu, Kuribayashi designed a defense that broke with Japanese military doctrine. Rather than establishing his defenses on the beach to face the landings directly, he created strong mutually-supporting defenses in depth by using static and heavy weapons such as heavy machine guns and artillery. Takeichi Nishi's armored tanks were to be used as camouflaged artillery positions. Because the tunnel linking the mountain to the main forces was never completed, Kuribayashi organized the southern area of the island in and around Mount Suribachi as a semi-independent sector, with his main defensive zone built up in the north. The expected American naval and air bombardment further prompted the creation of an extensive system of tunnels that connected the prepared positions so that a pillbox that had been cleared could be reoccupied. This network of bunkers and pillboxes favored the defense. For instance, the Nano Bunker (Southern Area Islands Naval Air HQ), which was east of Airfield Number 2, had enough food, water, and ammunition for the Japanese to hold out for three months. The bunker was 90 feet deep and had tunnels running in various directions. Approximately five hundred 55-gallon drums filled with water, kerosene, and fuel oil for generators were inside the complex. Gasoline-powered generators allowed for radios and lighting to be operated underground.

By 19 February 1945, when the Americans invaded,  of a planned  of tunnel network had been dug. Besides the Nanpo Bunker, there were numerous command centers and barracks that were 75 feet deep. Tunnels allowed for troop movement to go undetected to various defense positions.

Hundreds of hidden artillery and mortar positions along with land mines were placed all over the island. Among the Japanese weapons were 320 mm spigot mortars and a variety of explosive rockets.

Nonetheless, the Japanese supply was inadequate. Troops were supplied 60% of the standard issue of ammunition sufficient for one engagement by one division and food and forage for four months.

Numerous Japanese snipers and camouflaged machine gun positions were also set up. Kuribayashi specially engineered the defenses so that every part of Iwo Jima was subject to Japanese defensive fire. He also received a handful of kamikaze pilots to use against the enemy fleet; their attacks during the battle killed 318 American sailors. However, against his wishes, Kuribayashi's superiors on Honshu ordered him to erect some beach defenses.

Starting on 15 June 1944, the U.S. Navy and the U.S. Army Air Forces began naval bombardments and air raids against Iwo Jima, which would become the longest and most intense in the Pacific Theater. They would contain a combination of naval artillery shellings and aerial bombings that went on for nine months. On 17 February, the destroyer escort  sent Underwater Demolition Team 15 (UDT-15) toward Blue Beach for reconnaissance. The Japanese infantry fired on them, which killed one American diver. On the evening of 18 February, the Blessman was hit by a bomb from a Japanese aircraft, killing 40 sailors, including 15 members of her UDT.

Unaware of Kuribayashi's tunnel defense system, many of the Americans assumed that most of the Japanese garrison had been killed by the constant bombing raids.

Pre-landing bombardment

Maj. Gen. Harry Schmidt, commander of the Marine landing force, requested a 10-day heavy shelling of the island immediately preceding the mid-February amphibious assault. However, Rear Adm. William H. P. Blandy, commander of the Amphibious Support Force (Task Force 52), did not believe such a bombardment would allow him time to replenish his ships' ammunition before the landings; he thus refused Schmidt's request. Schmidt then asked for nine days of shelling; Blandy again refused and agreed to a three-day bombardment. This decision left much hard feeling among the Marines. After the war, Lieut. Gen. Holland M. "Howlin' Mad" Smith, commander Expeditionary Troops (Task Force 56, which consisted of Schmidt's Fifth Amphibious Corps), bitterly complained that the lack of naval gunfire had cost Marine lives during the entire Allied island campaign.

Each heavy warship was given an area on which to fire that, combined with all the ships, covered the entire island. Each warship fired for approximately six hours before stopping for a certain amount of time. Poor weather on D minus 3 led to uncertain results for that day's bombardment. On D minus 2, the time and care that the Japanese had taken in preparing their artillery positions became clear. When heavy cruiser  got within range of shore batteries, the ship was quickly hit 6 times and suffered 17 crew deaths. Later, 12 small craft attempting to land an underwater demolition team were all struck by Japanese rounds and quickly retired. While aiding these vessels, the destroyer  was also hit and suffered 7 crew deaths. On D minus 1, Adm. Blandy's gunners were once again hampered by rain and clouds. Gen. Schmidt summed up his feelings by saying, "We only got about 13 hours worth of fire support during the 34 hours of available daylight."

The limited bombardment had a questionable impact on the enemy due to the Japanese being heavily dug-in and fortified. The craters left behind by the barrage also provided additional cover for the defenders, while hampering the attackers' advance. However, many bunkers and caves were destroyed during the bombing, giving it some limited success. The Japanese had been preparing for this battle since March 1944, which gave them a significant advantage. By the time of the landing, about 450 American ships were located off Iwo Jima,  and the battle was to involve about 60,000 U.S. Marines and several thousand U.S. Navy Seabees.

Opposing forces

American
United States Fifth Fleet
Admiral Raymond A. Spruance in heavy cruiser Indianapolis
 Joint Expeditionary Force (Task Force 51)
 Vice Adm. Richmond Kelly Turner in amphibious command ship Eldorado
 Expeditionary Troops (Task Force 56)
 Lieutenant General Holland M. Smith, USMC

V Amphibious Corps
Major General Harry Schmidt, USMC

Southern sector (Green and Red beaches):
  5th Marine Division (25,884 officers and enlisted)
 Major General Keller E. Rockey
 26th Marine Regiment (Col. Chester B. Graham)
 27th Marine Regiment (Col. Thomas A. Wornham)
 28th Marine Regiment (Col. Harry B. Liversedge)
 13th Marine Regiment (Artillery) (Col. James D. Waller)

Northern sector (Yellow and Blue beaches):
  4th Marine Division (24,452 officers and enlisted)
 Major General Clifton B. Cates
 23rd Marine Regiment (Col. Walter W. Wensinger)
 24th Marine Regiment (Col. Walter I. Jordan)
 25th Marine Regiment (Col. John R. Lanigan)
 14th Marine Regiment (Artillery) (Col. Louis G. DeHaven)

Floating reserve:
  3rd Marine Division (19,597 officers and enlisted)
 Major General Graves B. Erskine
 3rd Marine Regiment (Col. James A. Stuart)
 9th Marine Regiment (Col. Howard N. Kenyon)
 21st Marine Regiment (Col. Hartnoll J. Withers)
 12th Marine Regiment (Artillery) (Lt. Col. Raymond F. Crist Jr.)

  147th Infantry Regiment (Ohio Army National Guard) (2,952 officers and enlisted)

Japanese
21,060 total men under arms
Lieut. General Tadamichi Kuribayashi, commanding
Colonel Tadashi Takaishi, chief of staff
 Army
 109th Division
 Navy
 4 anti-aircraft defense units

First day – 19 February 1945

Amphibious landing
During the night, Vice Adm. Marc Mitscher's Task Force 58, a huge carrier force, arrived off Iwo Jima. Also in this flotilla was Adm. Raymond A. Spruance, overall commander for the invasion, in his flagship, the heavy cruiser . "Howlin' Mad" Smith was once again deeply frustrated that Mitscher's powerful carrier group had been bombing the Japanese home islands instead of softening up the defenses of Iwo Jima. Mitscher's fliers however, did assist the additional surface-ship bombardment that accompanied the formation of the amphibious craft.

Unlike the days of the pre-landing bombardment, D-Day dawned clear and bright. At 08:59, one minute ahead of schedule, the first wave of Marines landed on the beaches of the southeastern coast of Iwo Jima. Major Howard Connor, 5th Marine Division signal officer, had six Navajo code talkers "Windtalkers" working around the clock during the first two days of the battle. These six sent and received over 800 messages, all without error. Connor later stated, "Were it not for the Navajos, the Marines would never have taken Iwo Jima."

Situation on the beaches
Unfortunately for the landing force, the planners at Pearl Harbor had completely misjudged the situation that would face Gen. Schmidt's Marines. The beaches had been described as "excellent" and the thrust inland was expected to be "easy." In reality, after crossing the beach, the Marines were faced with  slopes of soft black volcanic ash. This ash allowed for neither a secure footing nor the construction of foxholes to protect the Marines from hostile fire. However, the ash did help to absorb some of the fragments from Japanese artillery.

The lack of a vigorous response led the Navy to conclude that their bombardment had suppressed the Japanese defenses and in good order the Marines began deployment to the Iwo Jima beach. Gen. Kuribayashi was far from beaten, however. In the deathly silence, landed U.S. Marines began to slowly inch their way forward inland, oblivious to the danger. After allowing the Americans to pile up men and machinery on the beach for just over an hour, Kuribayashi unleashed the undiminished force of his countermeasures. Shortly after 10:00, everything from machine guns and mortars to heavy artillery began to rain down on the crowded beach, which was quickly transformed into a nightmarish bloodbath.

Time-Life correspondent Robert Sherrod described it simply as "a nightmare in hell."

The Japanese heavy artillery in Mount Suribachi opened their reinforced steel doors to fire, and then closed them immediately to prevent counterfire from the Marines and naval gunners. This made it difficult for American units to destroy a Japanese artillery piece. To make matters worse for the Americans, the bunkers were connected to the elaborate tunnel system so that bunkers that were cleared with flamethrowers and grenades were reoccupied shortly afterwards by Japanese troops moving through the tunnels. This tactic caused many casualties among the Marines, as they walked past the reoccupied bunkers without expecting to suddenly take fresh fire from them.

Moving off the beaches
Amtracs, unable to do more than uselessly churn the black ash, made no progress up the slopes; their Marine passengers had to dismount and slog forward on foot. Men of the Naval Construction Battalions 31 and 133, braving enemy fire, eventually were able to bulldoze roads off the beach. This allowed the Marines and equipment to finally make some progress inland and get off the jam-packed beaches. "Even so, in virtually every shell hole there lay at least one dead Marine ..."

By 11:30, some Marines had managed to reach the southern tip of Airfield No. 1, whose possession had been one of the (now highly unrealistic in the face of the actual defences) original American objectives for the first day. The Marines endured a fanatical 100-man charge by the Japanese, but were able to keep their toehold on Airfield No. 1 as night fell.

Crossing the island
In the left-most sector, the Americans did manage to achieve one of their objectives for the battle that day.

Action on the right flank
The right-most landing area was dominated by Japanese positions at the Quarry. The 25th Marine Regiment undertook a two-pronged attack to silence these guns. Their experience can be summarized by the ordeal of 2nd Lt. Benjamin Roselle, part of a ground team directing naval gunfire:

The 25th Marines' 3rd Battalion had landed approximately 900 men in the morning. Japanese resistance at the Quarry was so fierce that by nightfall only 150 Marines were left in fighting condition, an 83.3% casualty rate.

By the evening, 30,000 Marines had landed. About 40,000 more would follow. Aboard the command ship Eldorado, "Howlin' Mad" Smith saw the lengthy casualty reports and heard of the slow progress of the ground forces. To the war correspondents covering the operation he confessed, "I don't know who he is, but the Japanese general running this show is one smart bastard."

Subsequent combat
In the days after the landings, the Marines expected the usual Japanese banzai charge during the night. This had been the standard Japanese final defense strategy in previous battles against enemy ground forces in the Pacific, such as during the Battle of Saipan. In those attacks, for which the Marines were prepared, the majority of the Japanese attackers had been killed and the Japanese strength greatly reduced. However, General Kuribayashi had strictly forbidden these "human wave" attacks by the Japanese infantrymen because he considered them to be futile.

The fighting on the beachhead at Iwo Jima was very fierce. The advance of the Marines was stalled by numerous defensive positions augmented by artillery pieces. There, the Marines were ambushed by Japanese troops who occasionally sprang out of tunnels. At night, the Japanese left their defenses under cover of darkness to attack American foxholes, but U.S. Navy ships fired star shells to deny them the cover of darkness. On Iwo Jima (and other Japanese held islands), Japanese soldiers who knew English were used to harass and or deceive Marines in order to kill them if they could; they would yell "corpsman" pretending to be a wounded Marine, in order to lure in U.S. Navy hospital corpsmen attached to Marine infantry companies.

The Marines learned that firearms were relatively ineffective against the Japanese defenders and effectively used flamethrowers and grenades to flush out Japanese troops in the tunnels. One of the technological innovations of the battle, the eight Sherman M4A3R3 medium tanks equipped with a flamethrower ("Ronson" or "Zippo" tanks), proved very effective at clearing Japanese positions. The Shermans were difficult to disable, such that defenders were often compelled to assault them in the open, where they would fall victim to the superior numbers of Marines.

Close air support was initially provided by fighters from escort carriers off the coast. This shifted over to the 15th Fighter Group, flying P-51 Mustangs, after they arrived on the island on 6 March. Similarly, illumination rounds (flares) which were used to light up the battlefield at night were initially provided by ships, shifting over later to landing force artillery. Navajo code talkers were part of the American ground communications, along with walkie-talkies and SCR-610 backpack radio sets.

After running out of water, food and most supplies, the Japanese troops became desperate toward the end of the battle. Kuribayashi, who had argued against banzai attacks at the start of the battle, realized that defeat was imminent.

Marines began to face increasing numbers of nighttime attacks; these were only repelled by a combination of machine-gun defensive positions and artillery support. At times, the Marines engaged in hand-to-hand fighting to repel the Japanese attacks. With the landing area secure, more troops and heavy equipment came ashore, and the invasion proceeded north to capture the airfields and the remainder of the island. Most Japanese soldiers fought to the death.

Raising the flag on Mount Suribachi

Raising the Flag on Iwo Jima is a black and white photograph taken by Joe Rosenthal depicting six Marines from E Company, 2nd Battalion, 28th Marines, raising a U.S. flag atop Mount Suribachi on 23 February 1945, which was the second of two flag-raisings on the site that day. The photograph was extremely popular, being reprinted in thousands of publications. Later, it became the only photograph to win the Pulitzer Prize for Photography in the same year as its publication, and ultimately came to be regarded as one of the most significant and recognizable images of the war, and possibly the most reproduced photograph of all time. The flag raising picture was later used by Felix de Weldon to sculpt the Marine Corps War Memorial which is located adjacent to Arlington National Cemetery since 1954.

Three of the six Marines depicted in the photograph, Sergeant Michael Strank, Corporal Harlon Block, and Private First Class Franklin Sousley, were killed in action days after the flag-raising. Surviving flag-raiser Private First Class Ira Hayes, together with Private First Class Rene Gagnon and Navy hospital corpsman Pharmacist's Mate Second Class John Bradley, became celebrities upon their participation in a war bond selling tour after the battle; three subsequent Marine Corps investigations into the identities of the six men in the photograph determined: in 1946 and 1947, that Harlon Block was incorrectly identified as Henry Hansen (both were killed six days after the photo was taken), in May and June 2016, that John Bradley was not in the photograph and Private First Class Harold Schultz was, and in 2019, that Rene Gagnon was not in the photograph and Private First Class Harold Keller was.

By the morning of 23 February, Mount Suribachi was effectively cut off above ground from the rest of the island. The Marines knew that the Japanese defenders had an extensive network of below-ground defenses, and that in spite of its isolation above ground, the volcano was still connected to Japanese defenders via the tunnel network. They expected a fierce fight for the summit. Two small patrols from two rifle companies from the 2/28 Marines were sent up the volcano to reconnoiter routes on the mountain's north face. The recon patrols made it to the summit and scrambled down again, reporting any contact to the 2/28 Marines commander, Lieutenant Colonel Chandler W. Johnson.

Popular accounts embroidered by the press in the aftermath of the release of the photo of the flag raising, had the Marines fighting all the way up to the summit. Although the Marine riflemen expected an ambush, the larger patrol going up afterwards encountered a few Japanese defenders once on top and after the flag was raised. The majority of the Japanese troops stayed in the tunnel network due to U.S. shelling, only occasionally attacking in small groups, and were generally all killed. Johnson called for a reinforced platoon size patrol from E Company to climb Suribachi and seize and occupy the crest. The patrol commander, 1st Lt. Harold Schrier, was handed the battalion's American flag to be raised on top to signal Suribachi's capture, if they reached the summit. Johnson and the Marines anticipated heavy fighting, but the patrol encountered only a small amount of sniper fire on the way up the mountain. Once the top was secured by Schrier and his men, a length of Japanese water pipe was found there among the wreckage, and the American flag was attached to the pipe and then raised and planted on top of Mount Suribachi which became the first foreign flag to fly on Japanese soil. Photographs of the flag and some of the patrol members around it were taken by Marine photographer Louis R. Lowery, the only photographer who had accompanied Lt. Schrier's patrol up the mountain.

As the flag went up, Secretary of the Navy James Forrestal had just landed on the beach at the foot of Mount Suribachi and decided that he wanted the flag as a souvenir. Colonel Johnson, the battalion's commander, believed that the flag belonged to the 2nd Battalion, 28th Marines, who had captured that section of the island. In the early afternoon, Johnson sent Pfc. Rene Gagnon, a runner (messenger) from his battalion for E Company, to take a larger flag up the volcano to replace the smaller and less visible flag. The replacement flag was attached to another and heavier section of water pipe and six Marines proceeded to raise it into place as the smaller flag was taken down and delivered to the battalion's headquarters down below. It was during this second flag-raising that Joseph Rosenthal took the renowned photograph "Raising the Flag on Iwo Jima". The second flag flew on Mount Suribachi until it was taken down on 14 March, when at the same time an American flag was officially raised during a ceremony at the V Amphibious Corps command post near Mount Suribachi. The official flag raising was ordered by Lt. Gen. Holland Smith, the commander of all the troops on Iwo Jima, and attended by some members of the 3rd Marine Division and their commander General Graves B. Erskine.

Northern Iwo Jima

Despite Japan's loss of Mount Suribachi on the South end of the island, the Japanese still held strong positions on the north end. The rocky terrain vastly favored defense, even more so than Mount Suribachi, which was much easier to hit with naval artillery fire. Coupled with this, the fortifications constructed by Kuribayashi were more impressive than at the southern end of the island. Remaining under the command of Kuribayashi was the equivalent of eight infantry battalions, a tank regiment, and two artillery and three heavy mortar battalions. There were also about 5,000 gunners and naval infantry. The most arduous task left to the Marines was the taking of the Motoyama Plateau with its distinctive Hill 382 and Turkey knob and the area in between referred to as the Amphitheater. This formed the basis of what came to be known as the "meatgrinder". While this was being achieved on the right flank, the left was clearing out Hill 362 with just as much difficulty. The overall objective at this point was to take control of Airfield No. 2 in the center of the island. However, every "penetration seemed to become a disaster" as "units were raked from the flanks, chewed up, and sometimes wiped out. Tanks were destroyed by interlocking fire or were hoisted into the air on the spouting fireballs of buried mines". As a result, the fighting bogged down, with American casualties piling up. Even capturing these points was not a solution to the problem since a previously secured position could be attacked from the rear by the use of the tunnels and hidden pillboxes. As such, it was said that "they could take these heights at will, and then regret it".

The Marines nevertheless found ways to prevail under the circumstances. It was observed that during bombardments, the Japanese would hide their guns and themselves in the caves only to reappear when the troops would advance and lay devastating fire on them. The Japanese had over time learned basic American tactics, which was to lay heavy bombardment before an infantry attack. Consequently, General Erskine ordered the 9th Marine Regiment to attack under the cover of darkness with no preliminary barrage. This came to be a resounding success with many Japanese soldiers killed while still asleep. This was a key moment in the capture of Hill 362. It held such importance that the Japanese organized a counterattack the following night. Although Kuribayashi had forbidden the suicide charges familiar with other battles in the Pacific, the commander of the area decided on a banzai charge with the optimistic goal of recapturing Mount Suribachi. On the evening of 8 March, Captain Samaji Inouye and his 1,000 men charged the American lines, inflicting 347 casualties (90 deaths). The Marines counted 784 dead Japanese soldiers the next day. The same day, elements of the 3rd Marine Division reached the northern coast of the island, splitting Kuribayashi's defenses in two.

On 21 March, the Marines destroyed the command post in the gorge with four tons of explosives and on 24 March, Marines sealed the remaining caves at the northern tip of the island. However, on the night of 25 March, a 300-man Japanese force launched a final counterattack in the vicinity of Airfield No. 2. Army pilots, Seabees, and Marines of the 5th Pioneer Battalion and 28th Marines fought the Japanese force for up to 90 minutes, suffering heavy casualties (53 killed, 120 wounded). Although still a matter of speculation because of conflicting accounts from surviving Japanese veterans, it has been said that Kuribayashi led this final assault, which unlike the loud banzai charge of previous battles, was characterized as a silent attack. If ever proven true, Kuribayashi would have been the highest ranking Japanese officer to have personally led an attack during World War II. Additionally, this would also be Kuribayashi's final act, a departure from the normal practice of the commanding Japanese officers committing seppuku behind the lines while the rest perished in the banzai charge, as happened during the battles of Saipan and Okinawa. The island was officially declared secure at 09:00 on 26 March.

Once the island was officially declared secure, the Army's 147th Infantry Regiment was ostensibly there to act as a garrison force, but they soon found themselves locked in a bitter struggle against thousands of stalwart defenders engaging in a last-ditch guerrilla campaign to harass the Americans. Using well-supplied caves and tunnel systems, the Japanese resisted American advances. For three months, the 147th slogged across the island, using flamethrowers, grenades, and satchel charges to dig out the enemy, killing some 1,602 Japanese soldiers in small unit actions (along with many others who died in sealed caves) while suffering fifteen men killed in action and another 144 wounded. The Ohioans were also credited with capturing 867 Japanese; combined with the number of enemy soldiers killed, this casualty figure represented over 10% of the original Japanese garrison.

Flamethrowers

The United States M2 flamethrower was heavily used in the Pacific. It features two tanks containing fuel and compressed gas respectively, which are combined and ignited to produce a stream of flaming liquid out of the tip.

These flamethrowers were used to kill Japanese holed into pillboxes, buildings and caves. A battalion would assign one flamethrower per platoon with one reserve flamethrower in each group. Flamethrower operators were usually in more danger than regular troops as the short range of their weapon required close combat, and the visibility of the flames on the battlefield made them a prominent target for snipers. Still they were essential to breaking the enemy and one battalion commander called the flamethrowing tanks the "best single weapon of the operation."

Prior to Saipan the Marine Corps had left flamethrowing tank development to the Army. They had placed an order with the Army for nine tanks per Division. At Schofield Barracks Col. Unmacht's Top secret "Flame Thrower Group" located eight M4A3 Sherman medium tanks to convert for Operation Detachment. His Seabees, from the 117th CB, worked to combine the best elements from three different flame units: the Ronson, the Navy model I and the Navy Mk-1. That first model was quickly superseded by the far better CB-H2. The U.S. Army Chemical Corps variously identified these tanks as POA-CWS-H1, (Pacific Ocean Area-Chemical Warfare Section-Hawaii) CWS-POA-H2, CWS-POA-H1 H2, OR CWS-"75"-H1 H2 mechanized flamethrowers. U.S. Marine and U.S. Army observer documents from Iwo Jima refer to them as the CB-Mk-1 or CB-H1. Marines on the lines simply called them the Mark I. The official USMC designation was "M4 A3R5". The Japanese referred to them as M1 tanks and it is speculated that they did so due to a poor translation of "MH-1". On Iwo Jima the flame tanks all landed D-day and went into action on D+2, sparingly at first. As the battle progressed, portable flame units sustained casualty rates up to 92%, leaving few troops trained to use the weapon. More and more calls came for the Mark-1s to the point that the Marines became dependent upon the tanks and would hold up their assault until a flame tank was available. Since each tank battalion had only four they were not assigned. Rather, they were "pooled" and would dispatch from their respective refueling locations as the battle progressed. The Marines said that the flamethrowing tanks were the single best weapon they had in taking the island and that they were the only thing the Japanese feared.

Aftermath

Though ultimately victorious, the American victory at Iwo Jima had come at a terrible price. According to the Navy Department Library, "the 36-day assault resulted in more than 26,000 American casualties, including 6,800 dead." By comparison, the much larger scale 82-day Battle of Okinawa lasting from early April until mid-June 1945 (involving five U.S. Army and two Marine Corps divisions) resulted in over 62,000 U.S. casualties, of whom over 12,000 were killed or missing. Iwo Jima was also the only U.S. Marine battle where the American casualties exceeded the Japanese, although Japanese combat deaths numbered three times as many as American deaths. Two U.S. Marines were captured during the battle, neither of whom survived their captivity. The  was also lost, the last U.S. aircraft carrier sunk in World War II. 20 Grumman FM-2 Wildcat fighters and 11 Grumman TBM Avenger torpedo bombers went down with Bismarck Sea. She became a training ship. 31 Grumman F6F Hellcat fighters and 9 Grumman TBM Avenger torpedo bombers were destroyed by the kamikaze attack on Saratoga. Because all civilians had been evacuated, there were no civilian casualties at Iwo Jima, unlike at Saipan and Okinawa.

Strategic importance

In hindsight, given the number of casualties, the necessity and long-term significance of the island's capture to the outcome of the war became a contentious issue and remains disputed. The Marines, who suffered the actual casualties, were not consulted in the planning of the operation. As early as April 1945, retired Chief of Naval Operations William V. Pratt stated in Newsweek magazine that considering the "expenditure of manpower to acquire a small, God-forsaken island, useless to the Army as a staging base and useless to the Navy as a fleet base ... [one] wonders if the same sort of airbase could not have been reached by acquiring other strategic localities at lower cost."

The lessons learned on Iwo Jima served as guidelines for the following Battle of Okinawa and the planned invasion of the Japanese homeland. For example, "because of the casualties taken at Iwo Jima on the first day, it was decided to make the preparatory bombardment the heaviest yet delivered on to a Pacific island". Also, in the planning for a potential attack on the Japanese home islands, it was taken into account that around a third of the troops committed to Iwo Jima and again at Okinawa had been killed or wounded.

The justification for Iwo Jima's strategic importance to the United States' war effort has been that it provided a landing and refueling site for long-range fighter escorts. These escorts proved both impractical and unnecessary, and only ten such missions were ever flown from Iwo Jima. By the time Iwo Jima had been captured, the bombing campaign against Japan had switched from daylight precision bombing to nighttime incendiary attacks, so fighter escorts were of limited utility.

Japanese fighter aircraft based on Iwo Jima sometimes attacked AAF planes, which were vulnerable on their way to Japan because they were heavily laden with bombs and fuel. However, although some Japanese interceptors were based on Iwo Jima, their impact on the American bombing effort was marginal; in the three months before the invasion only 11 B-29s were lost as a result. The Superfortresses found it unnecessary to make any major detour around the island. Capturing the island neutralized Japanese air attacks based from it on the Marianas, but they were too small to ever launch significant attacks.

The Japanese on Iwo Jima had radar and were thus able to notify their comrades at home of incoming B-29 Superfortresses flying from the Mariana Islands. However, the capture of Iwo Jima did not affect the Japanese early-warning radar system, which continued to receive information on incoming B-29s from the island of Rota (which was never invaded).

As early as 4 March 1945, while fighting was still taking place, the B-29 Dinah Might of the USAAF 9th Bomb Group reported it was low on fuel near the island and requested an emergency landing. Despite enemy fire, the airplane landed on the Allied-controlled section of the island (South Field), without incident, and was serviced, refueled and departed.

In all, 2,251 B-29 landings on Iwo Jima were recorded during the war. Author J. Robert Moskin records that 1,191 fighter escorts and 3,081 strike sorties were flown from Iwo Jima against Japan. A more recent Air Force study found the contribution of VII Fighter Command superfluous. Another rationale for capturing the island was to serve as a base for shorter-range B-24 Liberator bombers against Japan, but no significant B-24 bombing campaign ever materialized.

Some downed B-29 crewmen were saved by air-sea rescue aircraft and vessels operating from the island, but Iwo Jima was only one of many islands that could have been used for such a purpose. As for the importance of the island as a landing and refueling site for bombers, Marine Captain Robert Burrell, then a history instructor at the United States Naval Academy, suggested that only a small proportion of the 2,251 landings were for genuine emergencies, the great majority possibly being for minor technical checkups, training, or refueling. According to Burrell,

The "emergency landing" thesis counts every B-29 landing on Iwo Jima as an emergency and asserts that capturing the island saved the lives of the nearly 25,000 crewmen of all 2,251 planes (2,148 B-29 crewmen were killed in combat during the whole war in all theaters). However, of the nearly 2,000 B-29s which landed from May–July 1945, more than 80% were for routine refueling. Several hundred landings were made for training purposes, and most of the remainder were for relatively minor engine maintenance. During June 1945 which saw the largest number of landings, none of the more than 800 B-29s that landed on the island did so due to combat damage. Of the aircraft that would have been lost without being able to land, air-sea rescue figures indicate that 50% of crewmen who ditched at sea survived, so even if Iwo Jima was never taken the estimate of the supposedly potential 25,000 dead crewmen from airplanes crashing into the ocean should be dwindled down to 12,500.

In publishing The Ghosts of Iwo Jima, Texas A&M University Press said that the very losses formed the basis for a "reverence for the Marine Corps" that not only embodied the "American national spirit" but ensured the "institutional survival" of the Marine Corps.

Naval vessels badly damaged
The following table lists for each ship badly damaged in the Battle of Iwo Jima, the dates they received hits, the cause, the type of ship, and the casualties inflicted during 17–28 February. The carrier , which received light damage, was listed because of the importance of escort carriers in the battle.

Legend:

Medal of Honor recipients

The Medal of Honor is the highest military decoration awarded by the United States government. It is bestowed on a member of the United States armed forces who distinguishes himself by "... conspicuous gallantry and intrepidity at the risk of his life above and beyond the call of duty while engaged in an action against an enemy of the United States ..." Because of its nature, the medal is commonly awarded posthumously; since its creation during the American Civil War it has been presented only 3,464 times.

The Medal of Honor was awarded to 27 U.S. Marines and U.S. sailors (14 posthumously), during the battle of Iwo Jima. 22 medals were presented to Marines (12 posthumously) and 5 were presented to sailors, 4 of whom were hospital corpsmen (2 posthumously) attached to Marine infantry units; 22 Medals of Honor was 28% of the 82 awarded to Marines in World War II.

At the time of his death on 29 June 2022, Hershel W. Williams (Marine Corps) was the last living Medal of Honor recipient from World War II. He received his medal for actions in the Battle of Iwo Jima.

Legacy

The Marine Corps Iwo Jima Memorial was dedicated on 10 November 1954 at Arlington National Cemetery.

On 19 February 1985, the 40th anniversary of the landings on Iwo Jima, an event called the "Reunion of Honor" was held (the event has been held annually since 2002). The veterans of both sides who fought in the battle of Iwo Jima attended the event. The place was the invasion beach where U.S. forces landed. A memorial on which inscriptions were engraved by both sides was built at the center of the meeting place. Japanese attended at the mountain side, where the Japanese inscription was carved, and Americans attended at the shore side, where the English inscription was carved. After unveiling and offering of flowers were made, the representatives of both countries approached the memorial; upon meeting, they shook hands. The combined Japan-U.S. memorial service of the 50th anniversary of the battle was held in front of the monument in February 1995. Further memorial services have been held on later anniversaries.

The importance of the battle to Marines today is demonstrated in pilgrimages made to the island, and specifically the summit of Suribachi. Marines will often leave dog tags, rank insignia, or other tokens at the monuments in homage. Iwo Jima Day is observed annually on 19 February in the Commonwealth of Massachusetts with a ceremony at the State House.

The Japanese government continues to search for and retrieve the remains of Japanese military personnel who were killed during the battle.

Depiction in media
The Battle of Iwo Jima has been featured in numerous films and documentaries. The U.S. military produced the 1945 documentaries To the Shores of Iwo Jima and Glamour Gal, a film about a Marine artillery piece and its crew. John Wayne starred in the feature film Sands of Iwo Jima in 1949.

"Iwo Jima", part eight of the 2010 HBO miniseries The Pacific produced by Tom Hanks and Steven Spielberg, includes part of the Battle of Iwo Jima from the point of view of John Basilone, from the beginning of the invasion until his death later in the day. Basilone was the only enlisted Marine to receive both the Medal of Honor and the Navy Cross in World War II.

Ira Hayes, one of the Marines who appeared in Joe Rosenthal's Raising the Flag on Iwo Jima photograph, was the subject of the 1961 film The Outsider, starring Tony Curtis as the conflicted flag raiser. Hayes was also depicted, along with Marine Rene Gagnon and Navy corpsman John Bradley in the 2006 film Flags of Our Fathers, directed by Clint Eastwood. Flags of Our Fathers is filmed from the American perspective and is based on the 2000 book by James Bradley and Ron Powers, Flags of Our Fathers. The 2006 film Letters from Iwo Jima, also directed by Clint Eastwood, depicts the battle from the Japanese perspective.

See also

 List of naval and land-based operations in the Pacific Theater during World War II
Naval Base Iwo Jima

References

Notes

Citations

Bibliography

Further reading

 
 
 
 
 
 
 
 
 
 
  – review of

External links

 Battle of Iwo Jima: 19 Feb 1945 – 26 Mar 1945, by C. Peter Chen. The site contains 250 photographs of and about Iwo Jima.
 Iwo Jima, a look back, by Raymond C. Backstrom.

 
1945 in Japan
Iwo Jima
Iwo Jima
Japan campaign
Iwo Jima
Iwo jima
Iwo Jima
Invasions by the United States
Iwo Jima
Iwo Jima
February 1945 events in Asia
March 1945 events in Asia
Amphibious operations involving the United States